Acinetobacter equi is a Gram-negative, rod-shaped and obligate aerobic bacterium from the genus of Acinetobacter which has been isolated from horse faeces.

References

External links
Type strain of Acinetobacter equi at BacDive -  the Bacterial Diversity Metadatabase

Moraxellaceae
Bacteria described in 2016